Lecocarpus pinnatifidus, the wing-fruited leocarpus, is a species of flowering plant in the family Asteraceae. It is found in only on the Floreana Island of the Galápagos Islands.

References 

pinnatifidus
Flora of the Galápagos Islands
Taxa named by Joseph Decaisne